The Thirlmere Lakes National Park is a protected national park that is located in the Macarthur region of New South Wales, in eastern Australia. It was gazetted in 1972 as Thirlmere Lakes State Park, before being subsequently reclassified as a national park.

History

The national park is one of the eight protected areas that, in 2000, was inscribed to form part of the UNESCO World Heritagelisted Greater Blue Mountains Area. The Thirlmere Lakes National Park is the most southeasterly and the smallest of the eight protected areas within the World Heritage Site.

Crisis
Two of the lakes have dried out since the mid 1980s due to removal of groundwater in the region secondary to coal mining at the Tahmoor Colliery. The local community is investigating plans to revive the lakes, which might take decades otherwise.

Features
The main feature of the park are the lakes, thought to have formed around 15 million years ago by geological activity, the land lifting and largely cutting them off from the local river system. Their outflow is reduced to the small Blue Gum Creek, which flows west into the Little River in the adjacent Nattai National Park to the west.

The lakes and their environs contain an unusual and diverse array of flora and fauna. It contains the rare freshwater sponge Radiospongilla sceptroides, and is notable for an absence of freshwater snails. The lakes contain the rare watershield (Brasenia schreberi) and are lined with rare species such as the grey sedge (Lepironia articulata) and the wooly frogsmouth lily (Philydrum lanuginosum). The habitat provides a home for the otherwise scarce Australasian bittern (Botaurus poiciloptilus), and migratory Latham's snipe Gallinago hardwickii.

The habitat around the lakes is open sclerophyll forest, the dominant trees being rough-barked apple (Angophora floribunda) nearby and sydney peppermint (Eucalyptus piperita) and red bloodwood (Corymbia gummifera) on elevated areas. The understory species include many familiar sydney sandstone flora such as members of the genera Banksia, Acacia, pea flowers, and the New South Wales waratah (Telopea speciosissima)

Climate

Gallery

See also

 Protected areas of New South Wales

References

External links

National parks of New South Wales
Protected areas established in 1972
1972 establishments in Australia
Blue Mountains (New South Wales)
Macarthur (New South Wales)